Lecce railway station  serves the city and comune of Lecce, in the region of Apulia, Southern Italy.  Opened in 1866, it is the southern terminus of the Adriatic Railway (Ancona–Lecce), and is also the terminus of two regional lines, the Martina Franca–Lecce railway and the Lecce–Otranto railway.

The station is currently managed by Rete Ferroviaria Italiana (RFI).  However, the commercial area of the passenger building is managed by Centostazioni.  Train services on the Adriatic Railway are operated by or on behalf of Trenitalia.  Each of these companies is a subsidiary of Ferrovie dello Stato (FS), Italy's state-owned rail company.

Services on the Martina Franca–Lecce railway and the Lecce–Otranto railway are operated by Ferrovie del Sud Est (FSE).

Location
Lecce railway station is situated at Piazzale Oronzo Massari, a short distance to the south west of the city centre.

History
The station was opened on 15 January 1866, upon the inauguration of the final section of the Adriatic Railway, between Brindisi and Lecce.  It remained a terminal station until 1 February 1868, when a new line was opened between Lecce and Zollino.  That line now forms part of the Lecce–Otranto railway.

From the date of its opening until the nationalisation of railways in Italy, the station was operated by the Società per le Strade Ferrate Meridionali (SFM).  It was then taken over by the FS.

This line later became the nucleus of the Martina Franca–Lecce railway, operated by the LSE. Since 1933, the Lecce-Maglie-Otranto railway, which serves as an extension of the Adriatic Railway, has also been operated by the LSE.

Train services

Adriatic Railway mainline trains depart from Lecce with destinations including Bari, Rome, Milan, Bologna, Venice and Turin.

The station is also served by regional trains operated by either Trenitalia or the FSE. Destinations linked by regional trains with Lecce include Bari, Foggia, Taranto, Manduria, Gallipoli (Italy), Otranto, Maglie, Santa Maria di Leuca, Novoli, Francavilla Fontana and Martina Franca.

The station is served by the following services:

High speed services (Frecciargento) Rome - Foggia - Bari - Brindisi - Lecce
High speed services (Frecciabianca) Milan - Parma - Bologna - Ancona - Pescara - Foggia - Bari - Brindisi - Lecce
High speed services (Frecciabianca) Turin - Parma - Bologna - Ancona - Pescara - Foggia - Bari - Brindisi - Lecce
High speed services (Frecciabianca) Venice - Padua - Bologna - Ancona - Pescara - Foggia - Bari - Brindisi - Lecce
Intercity services Bologna - Rimini - Ancona - Pescara - Foggia - Bari - Brindisi - Lecce
Night train (Intercity Notte) Rome - Foggia - Bari - Brindisi - Lecce
Night train (Intercity Notte) Milan - Parma - Bologna - Ancona - Pescara - Foggia - Bari - Brindisi - Lecce
Night train (Intercity Notte) Milan - Ancona - Pescara - Foggia - Bari - Taranto - Brindisi - Lecce
Night train (Intercity Notte) Turin - Alessandria - Bologna - Ancona - Pescara - Foggia - Bari - Brindisi - Lecce
Regional services (Treno regionale) Bari - Monopoli - Brindisi - Lecce
Local services (Treno regionale) Martina Franca - Francavilla Fontana - Novoli - Lecce
Local services (Treno regionale) Lecce - Zollino - Nardo - Gallipoli

See also

History of rail transport in Italy
List of railway stations in Apulia
Rail transport in Italy
Railway stations in Italy

References

External links

This article is based upon a translation of the Italian language version as at May 2014.

Railway Station
Railway stations in Apulia
Railway stations opened in 1866
1866 establishments in Italy
Buildings and structures in the Province of Lecce
Railway stations in Italy opened in the 19th century